Klæburuten was a Norwegian bus company located in Trondheim. It operated the regional buses in Klæbu and to Trondheim in addition to the Airport Bus from Trondheim to Trondheim Airport, Værnes.

The bus company operated 26 daily buses between Trondheim and Klæbu. In Trondheim buses stop both at Trondheim Central Station and Munkegata. The Airport Bus is operated at 15 minutes headway between the airport and town, with stops at most major hotels in town. In total the company had 10 city buses, 11 charter coaches and 21 airport coaches.

History
The company started out in 1923 when Arnt Krokum started Krokum Bilruter. The company started with one bus, then added a second in 1924. In 1945 the company started a bus service for Braathens S.A.F.E. between Trondheim and Lade Airport and Hommelvik Seaplane Base. In 1948 the company was converted to a limited company and four years later the company started a bus service to Trondheim Airport, Værnes on contract with Scandinavian Airlines System. The company started with charter trips in the 1950s, and as of 2006 still had the same three main activities and only one dominant owner.

In 2010 Klæburuten was sold to Nettbuss Trøndelag.

References

Bus companies of Trøndelag
Companies based in Trondheim
Transport companies established in 1923
Defunct bus companies of Norway
1923 establishments in Germany
Former subsidiaries of Vy Buss